Castanopsis costata is a tree in the family Fagaceae. The specific epithet  is from the Latin meaning "ribbed", referring to the leaf venation.

Description
The whitish bark is smooth, scaly or flaky.

Distribution and habitat
Castanopsis costata grows naturally in Thailand, Borneo, Peninsular Malaysia and Sumatra. Its habitat is lowland dipterocarp to montane forests from sea-level to  altitude.

Uses
The wood is locally used in construction. The nuts are considered edible.

References

costata
Trees of Thailand
Trees of Borneo
Trees of Peninsular Malaysia
Trees of Sumatra
Plants described in 1851
Flora of the Borneo montane rain forests
Flora of the Borneo lowland rain forests